Jarrad Hickey (born 7 May 1985) is a former professional rugby league footballer who played in the 2000s and 2010s for the Canterbury-Bankstown Bulldogs and the Wakefield Trinity Wildcats.

Background
Hickey was born in Sydney, New South Wales, Australia.

Career
Hickey played rugby league for St. Christopher's at Panania in his junior years.

Hickey played with Canterbury-Bankstown  from 2006 until 2011. He was eligible for Ireland.

On 15 April 2011 Hickey was signed by Super League club Wakefield Trinity Wildcats on a 2-year deal.

Midway through 2012 Hickey signed with NSW Cup team: Illawarra Cutters.

In 2014 Hickey played for Collegians RLFC in the Ilawarra Coal League

Controversy
Hickey was involved in great controversy during the final round of the 2009 NRL season, in Hazem El Masri's farewell game against the New Zealand Warriors. Hickey broke through the Warriors defence with El Masri in support and ran almost fifty metres to score. He also ignored two opportunities to offload the ball, denying El Masri the chance to score a try in his final home game. Hickey later revealed that he was keen on avoiding the dreaded post-season nudie run for all those without a try for the year. He was also dubbed "largest player in league history" by Rugby League guru Phil "Gus" Gould.

References

External links

Bulldogs profile
NRL profile

1985 births
Australian rugby league players
Canterbury-Bankstown Bulldogs players
Wakefield Trinity players
Illawarra Cutters players
Rugby league props
Living people
Rugby league players from Sydney